NCR may refer to:
 NCR Corporation, formerly National Cash Register
 "No carbon required" carbonless copy paper
 A Nature Conservation Review, UK book
 Naval Construction Regiment of US Navy Seabees
 New Carrollton station Amtrak code
 Not criminally responsible, insanity defense 
 Numeric character reference, a markup construct
 nCr or nCr, mathematical notation for combinations
 San Carlos Airport (Nicaragua) IATA code
 New California Republic, one of the major factions of Fallout: New Vegas

N for "National"
 National Capital Region, a conurbation surrounding capital
 National Capital Region (Canada)
 National Capital Region (India)
 National Capital Region (Japan)
 National Capital Region (Philippines)
 National Capital Region (United States)
 National Catholic Reporter, US
 National Collegiate Rugby

N for North or Northern
 North Coast Rocketry
 North Cross Route in London
 Former Northern Central Railway
 North Central Railways (India)